A correspondence law school is a school that offers legal education by distance education, either by correspondence or online by use of the internet, or a combination thereof.

China
Distance legal education in China is available through Beijing Foreign Studies University through a partnership with Spirit of Law School of Law. There are three courses available: Certificate, Diploma and LLM (Masters of Law) in International and Chinese Law. These are in English and aimed at international law and non-law professionals. These are officially awarded by the Ministry of Education and Ministry of Justice of the People's Republic of China.

Germany
Distance legal education in Germany is available through FernUniversität Hagen, a public university similar to the British Open University. The graduates receive LLB or LLM degrees. Specialized LLB degrees in business law are available through five universities of applied sciences: Hamburger Fernhochschule, Fachhochschule Nordhessen, Europäische Fernhochschule Hamburg, Fachhochschule Südwestfalen, and Hochschule Niederrhein.

South Africa
Distance legal education is an acceptable method to become a lawyer in South Africa, and is available through the University of South Africa (UNISA).

United Kingdom
Distance legal education in the United Kingdom is accepted by the Law Society of England and Wales as a qualifying law degree and one of the possible ways to become a solicitor or a barrister. Several institutions offer basic legal education (leading to the LLB degree), the oldest of which is the University of London External System. Numerous universities in the UK offer LLB degrees through distance education today, including the Open University.

In several other countries influenced by the British legal heritage, legal education can be obtained through distance education, including South Africa (through UNISA) and Australia.

United States

The only state that offers an ability to practice law via successful completion of a mandated 4 years of law school through either a correspondence or online law school is California. Once a law student has successfully completed their first year of law school, Business and Professions Code section 6060 requires the student to take and pass the First Year Law Student Examination, commonly known as the "BABY BAR," within the first three attempts of becoming eligible. If student fails to do so, all law school education beyond year one will be ignored by the state, the student must pass this exam before becoming a lawyer if they have obtained their entire degree online, or by correspondence law school. In the United States, non-ABA approved law schools and online/correspondence schools have lower bar passage rates than ABA-approved and traditional brick and mortar law schools.

History

Early years
Law school study by correspondence has existed in the United States since 1890 when Sprague Correspondence School of Law (which eventually merged with Blackstone Institute, and later was known as Blackstone School of Law) was established by William C. Sprague in Detroit, Michigan. Among the school’s early graduates was Antoinette D. Leach, early Sprague Law Correspondence Law School graduate and first woman attorney in Indiana, who in 1893 became the first woman admitted by the Indiana Supreme Court to practice law in Indiana. Later, in 1908, La Salle Extension University was founded in Chicago by Jesse Grant Chapline. It operated until 1982. Those schools and others (including American Correspondence School of Law of Chicago; Columbian Correspondence College of Law in Washington D.C.; New York Correspondence School of Law in New York; and others) were innovative for the time in providing many poor, working-class, women, and ethnic minorities educational opportunities. Among the La Salle Extension University graduates who went on to make contributions in law and politics are governors Harold J. Arthur and Eurith D. Rivers, Senator Craig L. Thomas, U.S. Representatives John S. Gibson and William T. Granahan, and African-American leaders Arthur Fletcher, Jessie M. Rattley, and Gertrude Rush.

Present day
Northwestern California University School of Law is the oldest existing correspondence law school in the United States. It was founded in 1982 and began presenting its correspondence program entirely online in 2002. It is the first online law school to offer Internet based and faculty led videoconferencing sessions for students for some courses.

In 1996, Abraham Lincoln University began a hybrid in-class and correspondence approach to law school, designed to offer scheduling flexibility to students, before adding an online component in 2004.

The first law school to offer a degree program completely online was Concord Law School, the law school of Purdue University Global (the online division for Purdue University), which started in 1998. As of 2006 Concord is the largest of the seven distance learning law schools. Concord graduated its first class in November 2002.

The California School of Law, founded in 2007, is the first law school to utilize synchronous technology in all courses. Such technology provides direct communication between professors and students in live “real time” virtual classrooms.

Correspondence and online legal education in California
Unlike other distance learning education institutions in the United States, law schools form a distinct subset of graduate institutions because of the unique requirements necessary to become a lawyer. The State Bar of California is currently the only state authority that "registers" and regulates distance learning law schools.

Graduates of correspondence and distance learning schools registered with the State Bar of California can sit for the California bar exam. Those who pass the California bar exam and meet the other requirements of California may practise law in California, as well as practise federal law (such as immigration law, etc.) in all states.  The other states have varying rules for graduates of the correspondence and distance learning law schools registered with the California State Bar.

California State Bar law school registration
Distance legal education in California is made up of "correspondence" and "distance learning" or online law schools.  The California State Bar website defines two classes of such schools:
 "Correspondence law schools" – which "conduct instruction primarily by correspondence". They include:
 American International School of Law (Irvine)
 California Southern University (Irvine)
 International Pacific School of Law (Los Angeles)
 MD Kirk School of Law (Los Angeles)
 Northwestern California University School of Law (Sacramento)
 Oak Brook College of Law and Government Policy (Fresno)
 Taft Law School (Santa Ana)
 University of Honolulu School of Law (Modesto)
 "Distance learning [or Online] schools" – which "conduct instruction and provide interactive classes primarily by technological means." They include:
 Abraham Lincoln University School of Law (Los Angeles)
 American Heritage University of Southern California (San Bernardino)
 American Institute of Law (Torrance)
 California School of Law (Santa Barbara)]
 Concord Law School at Purdue University Global (Los Angeles)
 St. Francis School of Law (Redwood City)

Use of Socratic Method

Traditional law schools in the United States teach by the question and answer Socratic or casebook method. Law schools using online technology are able to teach by this method through use of the Internet in live audio sessions. In this teaching method, students are assigned case opinions and statutes to read and brief before each class session. This pre-class preparation is followed by in-class (and on-line) presentations by the students. Law schools use the Socratic Method to teach students how to analyze and make legal arguments, how to properly read and brief cases and how to prepare for the pressures and rigors of a legal practice.

Synchronous and asynchronous online technologies

It is generally accepted that a crucial part of the Socratic Method process involves students being questioned by the professors, with follow-up questions. It is believed that such pedagogy helps prepare the students for the rigors of law practice, as well as teaching them how to engage in the type of analysis necessary to perform well on state bar attorney licensing exams.

Utilization of the Socratic Method pedagogy by online law schools in the traditional “interactive” direct question and answer format occurs through audio broadcast over the Internet of live sessions with professors calling on students and receiving immediate responses. There are two types of available technologies for online legal education, synchronous and asynchronous.

"Asynchronous technology” is a mode of online delivery in which the professors and students are not together at the same time and in which students receive course materials and access recorded lectures on their own schedule. Message board forums, e-mail exchanges, text messaging and recorded video are examples of asynchronous technology. This method of instruction has the advantage that the students need not be committed to be present for classes at set days and hours.

At one online law school using asynchronous technology, students may pose questions to the professors by text messaging or email, which the professors usually answer by text messaging or email within 48 hours. Also at this school, during their lectures professors may pose questions to the students, which the students answer by text messaging or emails.

“Synchronous technology” is a mode of online delivery where all participants are "present" and engaging simultaneously with each other at the same time. Web conferencing is an example of synchronous technology. This method of instruction has the advantage for online law schools that there is immediate “give and take” interaction in the questioning, answering, discussions and debates by and between the students and professors.

At one online law school using synchronous technology, students and professors “sign in” on the internet to a secure “virtual classroom” and engage in immediate give and take oral discussion and debate of the law, utilizing the Socratic Method in the classic way.

Accreditation and acceptance of credentials

Critics of distance learning law schools have noted that graduates of online law schools face some disadvantages, including (initial) ineligibility in some states to take the bar exam outside of California.

Correspondence and distance learning law schools are not accredited by the American Bar Association (ABA) or state bar examiners, even if they are registered with the California State Bar or licensed to confer academic degrees by relevant state education departments. Graduates of correspondence and distance learning law schools that are registered with the State Bar of California can sit for the California bar exam. The other states have varying rules for graduates of correspondence and distance learning law schools registered with the California State Bar: (a) a few states allow such graduates to immediately sit for the bar exams after graduation; (b) some states allow such graduates to sit for the bar exam immediately after passing the California Bar Exam; (c) several states allow graduates of correspondence and distance learning law schools to sit for the bar exams after passing the California Bar Exam and then gaining experience as an attorney: and (d) some states do not allow such graduates to ever sit for their bar exams.

Proponents of such exclusions argue that without ABA accreditation, there is no effective way to check that a law school meets minimum academic standards and that its graduates are prepared to become attorneys. The ABA stated in a 2003 policy document, "Neither private study, correspondence study or law office training, nor age or experience should be substituted for law-school education."

Concord Law School Dean Barry Currier maintains optimism regarding the acceptance of online law school degrees, saying that "once people see what we do over time, the degrees will be accepted." William Hunt, Dean of The California School of Law has noted that online schools have the ability to utilize the Socratic Method pedagogy as it is used at traditional law schools. Others have noted that the ABA's position on online and correspondence law schools is motivated more by a desire to exercise monopoly power and to protect traditional law schools' exclusivity. Law professor Michael Froomkin made a similar point, "The losers in the new era of legal education will be second- and third-tier institutions that lack name recognition and its concomitant prestige, and their faculties ... They will either have to become discount law schools, or go online themselves."

Graduates of California online schools have commenced legal actions in order to sit for the bar exam in their home states. Mel Thompson, a 2005 graduate of the West Coast School of Law, attempted to sue the ABA and the Connecticut Bar Examining Committee, alleging that Connecticut's refusal to let him sit for the bar exam violated due process, equal protection, and served as an "arbitrary" and unlawful restraint on trade. Thompson's grievance did not succeed and in 2007 his suit was dismissed. In 2007 Ross Mitchell, a 2004 graduate of Concord Law School, filed suit against the Massachusetts Board of Bar Examiners. Mitchell's suit was more successful than Thompson's; in 2008 the state’s Supreme Judicial Court granted Mitchell permission to take the Massachusetts bar exam. In 2009 Mitchell passed the bar and became the first online law school graduate sworn into the state bar of Massachusetts.

California Bar Examination statistics

Statistics for the California Bar Examation and First-Year Law Students' Examination ("Baby Bar"), including those for correspondence law schools and distance learning law schools, are provided by the California State Bar.  The data show much lower bar passage rates for California-Accredited law schools than for ABA approved law schools.

Consumer (student) protection

A concern in US distance education is the existence of diploma mills and schools which engage in fraudulent practices. In 1994, the St. Petersburg (Florida) Times published information about a Rev. James Kirk who opened a diploma mill calling it LaSalle University in Slidell, Louisiana, which, while being investigated by Louisiana authorities, "contend[ed] it [was] exempt from licensing because even though it offers degrees in engineering and law, it is a religious institution." In response to the historically low bar passage rate of students graduating from unaccredited law schools, including correspondence/online schools, the California State Legislature passed legislation in 2007 transferring oversight authority of unaccredited law schools from the Bureau for Private Postsecondary and Vocational Education (which oversees non-law education), to the State Bar.

See also
 Lists of law schools – Worldwide listing
 Reading law

References

Further reading
 Robert J. Salzer, "Comment: Juris Doctor.com: Are Full-Time Internet Law Schools the Beginning of the End For Traditional Legal Education?", 12 CommLaw Conspectus 101 (2004)
 Nick Dranias, "Past the Pall of Orthodoxy: Why the First Amendment Virtually Guarantees Online Law School Graduates Will Breach the ABA Accreditation Barrier", 111 Penn St. L. Rev. 863 (2007)
 Steve Sheppard, "Casebooks, Commentaries, and Curmudgeons: An Introductory History of Law in the Lecture Hall", 82 Iowa L. Rev. 547 (1997) (on the Socratic method)
 Bruce A. Kimball, "The Proliferation of Case Method Teaching in American Law Schools: Mr. Langdell's Emblematic 'Abomination,' 1890-1915", History of Education Quarterly, Vol. 46, No. 2, p. 192, Jun. 2006 (on the casebook and Socratic methods)
 Daniel C. Powell, "Five Recommendations to Law Schools Offering Legal Instruction over the Internet", 11 J. Tech. L. & Pol'y 285 (2006).
 Robert E. Oliphant, "Will Internet Driven Concord University Law School Revolutionize Traditional Law School Teaching?", 27 Wm. Mitchell L. Rev. 841 (2000)
 Stephen M. Johnson, "www.lawschool.edu: Legal Education in the Digital Age", Wis. L. Rev. 85 (2000)

External links
 ABA-CLE Career Resource Center
 Committee of Bar Examiners: California Law Schools

Law schools
Law schools in the United States
Distance education